The Weightlifting competitions at the 2019 Southeast Asian Games in Manila took place at Ninoy Aquino Stadium in Manila.

The 2019 Games featured 10 events.

Results

Men's 55 kg

Men's 61 kg

Men's 67 kg

Men's 73 kg

Women's 45 kg

Women's 49 kg

Women's 55 kg

Women's 59 kg

Women's 64 kg

Women's 71 kg

References

External links
  

2019 Results
Southeast Asian Games